Pedro Celestino Silva Soares (born 2 January 1987), known as Celestino, is a Cape Verdean professional footballer who plays as a central midfielder.

He also held a Portuguese passport, due to the many years spent in the country.

Club career
Born in Tarrafal, Celestino spent six years at Sporting CP (formative years included), but never appeared officially for the first team. He spent his first season as a professional with C.D. Olivais e Moscavide, on loan, being relegated from the Segunda Liga.

For 2007–08, also on loan, Celestino joined G.D. Estoril Praia but, in January 2008, still owned by Sporting, moved to another side in the Lisbon region, C.F. Estrela da Amadora. He made his competitive debut on the 20th, starting in a 1–0 home win against S.C. Braga in the Taça de Portugal, and played his first Primeira Liga match the following week, featuring the second half of the 1–1 draw at Associação Naval 1º de Maio.

Celestino suffered top-flight relegation with Estrela in the following campaign, due to irregularities. He met the same fate with his following club, C.F. Os Belenenses, but only due to sporting factors this time.

On 16 August 2011, Celestino signed a three-year contract with CFR Cluj in Romania. He returned to Portugal subsequently, going on to represent S.C. Olhanense and Atlético Clube de Portugal.

On 7 February 2019, Celestino agreed to a deal at FC Farul Constanța, moving to the Liga II side alongside compatriots João Diogo and Diogo Rosado.

International career
Celestino earned seven caps for the Portugal under-21 team. His debut occurred on 16 October 2007, as he played the entire 2–1 away victory over Montenegro in the 2009 UEFA European Championship qualifiers and provided the assist for Tiago Targino's winning goal.

Honours
CFR Cluj
Liga I: 2011–12

References

External links

1987 births
Living people
Portuguese sportspeople of Cape Verdean descent
Cape Verdean footballers
Portuguese footballers
Association football midfielders
Primeira Liga players
Liga Portugal 2 players
Segunda Divisão players
Amora F.C. players
Sporting CP footballers
C.D. Olivais e Moscavide players
G.D. Estoril Praia players
C.F. Estrela da Amadora players
C.F. Os Belenenses players
S.C. Olhanense players
Atlético Clube de Portugal players
G.D. Fabril players
C.D. Pinhalnovense players
Liga I players
Liga II players
CFR Cluj players
FCV Farul Constanța players
Cypriot Second Division players
Enosis Neon Paralimni FC players
Portugal youth international footballers
Portugal under-21 international footballers
Cape Verdean expatriate footballers
Portuguese expatriate footballers
Expatriate footballers in Portugal
Expatriate footballers in Romania
Expatriate footballers in Cyprus
Cape Verdean expatriate sportspeople in Portugal
Portuguese expatriate sportspeople in Romania
Portuguese expatriate sportspeople in Cyprus